This article is about the particular significance of the year 2011 to Lithuania and its people.

Incumbents 
President: Dalia Grybauskaitė
Prime Minister: Andrius Kubilius

Chairmanships 
Organization for Security and Co-operation in Europe

Events

January 
January 1 – Lithuania received chairmanship of Organization for Security and Co-operation in Europe
January 1 – Strong snowstorm results in approximately 34,000 people being left without electricity.
January 1 – Lithuania received chairmanship of NATO embassy in Georgia to represent alliance in country and help it to join to the NATO.
January 21 – Prime Minister Andrius Kubilius called a special meeting because of too big heating prices in Capital City of Vilnius.
January 25 – 4 elderships in Pagėgiai municipality announced extreme situation because of floods.

February 
February 7 – Nemunas River flood started in Jonava district municipality and Kaunas district municipality.
February 8 – strong wind killed 3 people, 46,000 people being left without electricity and closed Port of Klaipėda
February 26–27 – national elections to cities councils.

March 
March 8 – resignation of Minister of Economy Dainius Kreivys.
March 23 – Lithuanian government approves of personal bankruptcy legislation.

April
April 28 – Lithuania's Omnitel opened LTE "4G" network working in 5 biggest cities.

May

June 
June 28 – Seimas approved  the law under which Lithuanian-Belorussian border inhabitants can easily cross the border.

July 
July 6 – Ieva Gervinskaitė won Miss Lithuania 2011.
July 8 – Agrowill Group become second Lithuanian company which selling shares on the Warsaw Stock Exchange.
July 10 – Lithuania won FIBA Under-19 World Championship.

Art and entertainment 
May
 May 27 Sidabrinė gervė 2011
Lithuania in the Eurovision Song Contest 2011

Sports

Multi-sport events 
SELL Student Games in Kaunas.

Athletics (track and field) 
4 March – Austra Skujytė won silver medal in 2011 European Athletics Indoor Championships. It is the first independent Lithuania medal in championship.
Local events
February 18–19 – National Indoor championship in Klaipėda.
May 25 – Lithuania Open 100 km running championship in Nida.
July 23–24 – 2011 Lithuanian Athletics Championships in Kaunas.
September 11 – Vilnius Marathon.
September 24 – National Half Marathon Championship in Nida.

Basketball 
September 3–18 – Lithuania will host EuroBasket 2011.

Boxing 
 2011 Lithuanian Boxing Championships

Darts 
October 14 - Vilnius will host Lithuania Open darts championship.

Football 
2010–11 Baltic League.
2010–11 Lithuanian Football Cup.

Sambo 
 Vilnius wil host the 2011 World Sambo Championships.

Snowboarding 
29 January first time started Lithuanian Snowboarding Championships

Swimming 
28–30 June 2011 Lithuania Swimming Championships in Alytus

Volleyball 
11–14 August Capital City of Vilnius wil host U18 European Beach Volleyball Championships for men and women near the White Bridge.

Deaths 
Justinas Marcinkevičius (born 1930) a prominent Lithuanian poet and playwright.

References 

 
Lithuania